Heo Su-bong  (Hangul: 허수봉; born  in Ulsan) is a South Korean male volleyball player. He was the first high school player to be drafted in the first round in 2016 to Incheon Korean Air Jumbos before being traded to Cheonan Hyundai Capital Skywalkers.

He has been part of the South Korea men's national volleyball team since 2019.

References

1998 births
Living people
South Korean men's volleyball players
Sportspeople from Ulsan
21st-century South Korean people